Sleeping Venus may refer to:

Sleeping Venus (Carracci), a circa 1603 painting by Annibale Carracci
Sleeping Venus (Giorgione), a 1510 painting by Giorgione and Titian
Sleeping Venus (Delvaux painting), a 1944 painting by Paul Delvaux
Sleeping Venus with Cupid (Poussin), a 1630 painting by Nicolas Poussin